Stan Kugell is an American investor, entrepreneur, inventor, and computer scientist.  He is current or former director of over a dozen corporate and non-profit boards. He remains active advising technology entrepreneurs privately and as a Mentor at the Harvard i-Lab.  He was a research scientist at the Stanford Artificial Intelligence Lab, where he invented Dired.  At the Xerox Palo Alto Research Center he and Ed McCreight built the first voicemail system.  He co-founded Javelin Software and was primary designer of its user interface.  He is inventor or co-inventor of seven U.S. and international patents and applications.

  He co-hosted Kugell & McLaughlin, a nationally syndicated political talk radio program, and served as a commentator on the public radio show Marketplace and on the Pacifica Radio Network.

Notes

American computer scientists
Year of birth missing (living people)
Living people
Harvard Law School alumni
Harvard Kennedy School alumni
Stanford University alumni
Massachusetts Institute of Technology alumni